Gábor Horváth may refer to:

 Gábor Horváth (canoeist), Hungarian sprint canoeist, competed since 2006
 Gábor Horváth (kayaker) (born 1971), Hungarian sprint canoer, competed from 1993 to 2005 in kayak
 Gábor Horváth (footballer, born 1985), Hungarian football player
 Gábor Horváth (footballer, born 1983), Hungarian  football player